The Fairphone 2 is a touchscreen-based, dual-SIM smartphone designed to be easily repaired by the user. First released in December 2015, it was the first modular smartphone available for purchase and has since received both hardware improvements and major software updates, initially shipping with Android 5 "Lollipop" and running Android 10 as of November 2021. Production ceased in 2018.

It is the second phone from the social enterprise Fairphone and the first one completely designed by it. The phone is ethically sourced, using conflict-free minerals, Fairtrade gold and recycled materials. It was assembled in audited factories with good working conditions.

Design

Hardware choice 

The phone is designed to have a higher life expectancy (five years) than other phones.

The main challenge with the Fairphone 1 was a system on a chip (SoC) Mediatek MT6589 that was not widely used and thus did not receive long-term software support from its manufacturer. For the Fairphone 2, Fairphone chose the widely used Snapdragon 801 platform (a high-end, early 2014 platform); the popularity of this SoC should help maintain the LTS of Fairphone 2.

Fairphone deliberately did not include recent innovations like wireless charging or USB-C ports, ensuring a lower price and fewer compatibility issues. However, the modular design of the phone allows the Fairphone team to develop newer modules with updated components. Newer versions of the modular design contains cameras.

Also, the back of the Fairphone 2 is equipped with a USB pin-out and charging input, allowing aftermarket back covers with extended capabilities.

Ethical considerations 
The phone is designed to have a lower environmental impact than comparable mass-market smartphones, with an expected lifespan of five years. The modular design allows components to be replaced individually.

Many electronic devices contain conflict minerals (tin, tungsten, tantalum and gold) from the Democratic Republic of the Congo (DRC), used by armies and rebel groups to fund war in the country. Therefore some manufacturers avoid all materials from the DRC, but this reduces employment opportunities in the country. The Fairphone 2 supply chain was audited to ensure that these materials come from mines that do not fund armed groups, while supporting local communities in the DRC (where possible) in order to provide an alternative to conflict mines. The tantalum and tin ores are sourced from conflict-free mines in the DRC, the tungsten is from Rwanda, and the gold is from a Fairtrade-certified mine in Peru. In addition, the phone includes recycled plastic, copper, and tungsten.

The Fairphone 2 was assembled by Hi-P in Suzhou, China, in a factory which has been audited to ensure that it meets high standards for working conditions and for the environment.

Modular design 

The Fairphone 2 is the first modular smartphone available to the general public. The modular, repairable design is designed to increase longevity, with an additional focus on increasing the recyclability of the product. The phone components are designed to be replaceable, with the end user only needing to use a screwdriver to replace components of the phone. In addition, it is possible to replace individual components within each module.

The phone received a 10 out of 10 score for smartphone repairability from iFixit, the highest score that was ever given to a phone.

The phone consists of seven removable parts; the main chassis, the battery, the display assembly, the rear camera module, the top module (selfie camera, headphones, speaker, sensors), the bottom module (loudspeaker, vibration, microphone and charging port), and the back protective cover. Except for an updated slim case design, the first module set to be upgraded was the cameras, with a new rear camera module (with a dual LED flash and 12 megapixel camera) and top module (with a 5 megapixel camera) in September 2017.

Software

Costs 
The phone was primarily funded through pre-orders, and is mostly being sold directly, though in some markets the phone is available through resellers such as The Phone Co-op in the UK. The pre-order campaign started on 16 July 2015 and ended on 30 September 2015, with 17,418 phones pre-ordered (the objective was 15,000).

Just as they did for the Fairphone 1, Fairphone released details about costs for the Fairphone 2, sold for an average price of €525. Despite its relatively high price compared to many phones (a similarly equipped "normal" phone cost about US$402–500), the margin on each phone sold is only €9, principally due to low sales volume and higher manufacturing costs than most phones. The price also funds a wide range of Fairphone's goals to make the phone more ethical, including recycling programs and partnerships for reduced usage of "blood minerals".

Sales 
On 16 July 2015, pre-orders for Fairphone 2 became available. To order the components needed to assemble the first devices, as well as to generate the revenue needed to ensure continuous production, Fairphone initiated a crowdfunding campaign by setting a goal to achieve 15,000 pre-orders by the end of September. The goal was finally exceeded, reaching a total of 17,418 pre-orders before the pre-order period ended on 30 September. Production started in December 2015, with the aim of shipping all phones ordered during the crowdfunding campaign during that month. However, issues in ramping up production caused a delay. The last pre-ordered device was shipped on 8 February 2016. On 26 May 2016, Fairphone reported that their milestone of selling 40,000 of the Fairphone 2 had been reached, and that all phones ordered before that date had been shipped.

See also 
 Fairphone 1
 Fairphone 3
 Fairphone 4
 Modular smartphone, concept of phone for which components can be replaced
 List of open-source mobile phones, phones with open source operating system
 Sailfish OS, an operating system based on Linux as an alternative to Android
 Project Ara, a project by Google to create a low price modular phone. Discontinued in September 2016

Footnotes

References

External links 
 
 Video of the Fairphone 2 being disassembled and reassembled 

Fair trade brands
Android (operating system) devices
Ubuntu Touch devices
Smartphones
Modular smartphones
Mobile phones with user-replaceable battery
Mobile phones introduced in 2015